In October 1917 Nieuport began construction of a prototype monoplane fighter known as the Nieuport Madon, a strut braced monoplane.

Design and development
The tapered shoulder mounted wing was supported by lift struts attached to the landing gear, which featured an additional constant chord lifting area between the wheels. A section of wing root was cut away to improve downward visibility. The fuselage and wing were fabric covered. It was armed with two synchronized   Vickers machine guns.
The first prototype made its first flight in early January 1918 while powered by a  Gnome Monosoupape 9N rotary engine, the same engine used in the Nieuport 28.

The second prototype first flew in late January 1918 with the slightly more powerful  Le Rhône 9R. This aircraft had a revised wing whose inboard trailing edges were cut away and it had an elongated fin. On 1 May 1918 the second prototype was rejected in favour of the  Monosoupape powered model.

The Nieuport Madon was not officially accepted but would be refined through the Nieuport 31 the Nieuport-Delage Sesquiplan and eventually into the Nieuport-Delage NiD 62 which was still in second line service in 1940.

Specifications

See also

Fokker D.VIII
Morane-Saulnier AI
Bristol M.1

References

Citations

Bibliography

 

Madon
1910s French military aircraft
1910s French fighter aircraft
Rotary-engined aircraft
Sesquiplanes
Single-engined tractor aircraft
Aircraft first flown in 1918